Skin mask may refer to:

 A mask made of animal skin
 Facial masks, a form of cosmetic treatment
 A facial prosthetic
 A mask made of human skin